Lars Henrik Gustavsson (born 21 October 1976) is a Swedish former footballer who played as a goalkeeper, most notably for Åtvidabergs FF.

External links
 

1976 births
Åtvidabergs FF players
Allsvenskan players
Superettan players
Swedish footballers
Living people
Association football goalkeepers